BBC Gàidhlig is the department of BBC Scotland that produces Scottish Gaelic-language (Gàidhlig) programming. This includes TV programmes for BBC Alba, the BBC Radio nan Gàidheal radio station and the BBC Alba website. Its managing editor is Marion MacKinnon.

Television
The department is responsible for Gaelic programming for television from the BBC. 
BBC Gàidhlig produces a number of programmes for the Gaelic-language television channel, BBC Alba, which is a joint venture between the BBC and MG Alba.

Some of BBC Gàidhlig's more notable programming includes the international issues magazine  (Europe), children's programme  (What Now?) and comedy sketch show  (Back on the Ran Dan).  Dè a-nis? won the department an award at the Celtic Media Festival in 2009.

BBC Gaidhlig also produces programming to cover the Royal National Mòd. For instance, during the National Mòd in Caithness in 2010, BBC Gaidhlig produced daily programmes to cover the event, which were aired and repeated on BBC Alba, as well as being repeated on BBC Two Scotland.

Radio
BBC Gàidhlig is also responsible for the national Scottish Gaelic radio station BBC Radio nan Gàidheal. The station broadcasts across Scotland on FM, DAB digital radio, digital television and online. When it's not broadcasting Gaelic programming, it simulcasts BBC Radio Scotland.

Online
In July 2008, the BBC Alba website launched an extended news service to tie in with the launch of the digital television channel. Programmes from BBC Alba and Radio nan Gaidheal are also available online on BBC iPlayer.

See also
Gaelic broadcasting in Scotland
List of Celtic-language media

References

External links

Television in Scotland
Scottish Gaelic mass media
BBC Scotland